Bradach may refer to:

Nant Bradach, a valley in Wales
Llanbradach, a village in Wales

People 
 Ivan Bradach (1732–1772)
 Mykhaylo Bradach (1748–1815)